Fifth-seeded Patricia Todd defeated Doris Hart 6–3, 3–6, 6–4 in the final to win the women's singles tennis title at the 1947 French Championships.

Seeds
The seeded players are listed below. Patricia Todd is the champion; others show the round in which they were eliminated.

  Margaret Osborne (semifinals)
  Doris Hart (finalist)
  Louise Brough (semifinals)
  Nelly Landry (second round)
  Patricia Todd (champion)
  Sheila Piercey (quarterfinals)
  Magda Rurac (quarterfinals)
  Zsuzsi Körmöczy (quarterfinals)
  Helena Straubeova (third round)
  Jadwiga Jędrzejowska (third round)
  Alice Weiwers (third round)
  Anne-Marie Seghers (third round)
  Miriamme De Borman (third round)
  Márta Peterdy (third round)
  Annalisa Bossi (third round)
  Dorothy Muller (third round)

Draw

Key
 Q = Qualifier
 WC = Wild card
 LL = Lucky loser
 r = Retired

Finals

Earlier rounds

Section 1

Section 2

Section 3

Section 4

References

External links
   on the French Open website

1947 in women's tennis
1947
1947 in French women's sport
1947 in French tennis